Tulsa Community College is a public community college in Tulsa, Oklahoma. It was founded in 1970 and is the largest two-year college in Oklahoma. It serves approximately 23,000 students per year in classes. TCC consists of four main campuses, two community campuses, and a conference center situated throughout the Tulsa metropolitan area with an annual budget of approximately $112 million. The college employs about 2,270 people, including 280 full-time faculty and 536 adjunct faculty.

In May 2021, TCC was recognized as #1 in Student Success and Leadership Safety and Planning with two 2021 Awards of Excellence from the American Association of Community Colleges.

Tulsa Achieves, established in 2007, provides a path to college for all eligible Tulsa County high school seniors immediately following high school graduation. Tulsa Achieves pays tuition and fees for three years or up to 63 credit hours and served as a model for many similar programs across the country.

Notable alumni
 AleXa - K-pop idol under ZB Label
 Chris Benge - Executive Director, Rural and Tribal Health Policy, OSU Center for Health Sciences 
 Randy Blake - basketball player; professional kickboxer
 Ernie Jones - Social Studies Teacher and Coach, Cascia Hall Preparatory 
 Tim Lyons - CEO, TTCU Federal Credit Union 
 Jeannie McDaniel - Retired Legislator 
 Rebecca Petty - Republican member of the Arkansas House of Representatives from Rogers, Arkansas
 Jim Presley - Commercial Real Estate Appraiser 
 Wes Studi - Cherokee American Film Actor and Producer
 Clifton Taulbert - President & CEO, The Freemount Corporation & Roots Java Coffee

References

External links
Official website

Community colleges in Oklahoma
OK Cooperative Alliance
Educational institutions established in 1970
1970 establishments in Oklahoma
Buildings and structures in Tulsa, Oklahoma
Aviation schools in the United States
Universities and colleges in Tulsa, Oklahoma